Benjamin Leroy (born 7 April 1989) is a French professional footballer who plays as a goalkeeper for  club Ajaccio.

Club career
Leroy started his career with Châteauroux before joining Tours in 2009 and made his senior debut in the 0–1 defeat away to Sedan on 27 May 2011. Since the following season, Leroy became a regular in the first team and played over 100 league matches for Tours until the end of the 2013–14 Ligue 2 campaign.

In July 2014, he moved to Ligue 1 side Evian on a four-year contract. Halfway through the 2014–15 season, Leroy became the starter replacing Jesper Hansen in goal. Evian suffered relegation at the end of the season, and Leroy continued as the starter in the 2015–16 Ligue 2 season.

On 17 June 2016, Leroy signed a three-year contract with Dijon.

On 19 June 2018, after being a backup to Baptiste Reynet, Leroy signed with Ajaccio. He grew into a starter for the club, and in the 2019–20 season he was voted into the Ligue 2 Team of the Season by France Football. His strong performances continued, and in the 2021–22 season, he was also voted into the UNFP Ligue 2 Team of the Year.

Honours
Individual
France Football Team of the Season: 2019–20
UNFP Ligue 2 Team of the Year: 2021–22

References

External links
Benjamin Leroy profile at foot-national.com

1989 births
Living people
People from Cucq
Sportspeople from Pas-de-Calais
French footballers
Association football goalkeepers
LB Châteauroux players
Tours FC players
Thonon Evian Grand Genève F.C. players
Dijon FCO players
AC Ajaccio players
Ligue 1 players
Ligue 2 players
Footballers from Hauts-de-France